Ross Ford is an American politician serving as a member of the Oklahoma House of Representatives from the 76th district. He assumed office in 2017. He is the nephew of the second longest serving state legislator in Oklahoma history, Charles Ford.

References

21st-century American politicians
Living people
Year of birth missing (living people)
Republican Party members of the Oklahoma House of Representatives